The Dripping Springs Trail is a hiking trail on the South Rim of the Grand Canyon National Park, located in the U.S. state of Arizona.

Access and description
The trail begins along the Hermit Trail after a  hike from Hermit's Rest.

From Hermit Trail, the trail leaves the Hermit Basin and crosses to the western side of Hermit Canyon towards Dripping Springs. After another  the trail crosses the Dripping Springs drainage and connects to the Boucher Trail, which leads to the north along the western side of Hermit Canyon.

The Dripping Springs Trail continues westward from the trail junction for another , climbing back out of the Hermit Shale and Coconino Sandstone layers to Dripping Springs, a perennial water source. Water from here needs to be treated, filtered, or boiled prior to consuming. After the springs, the trail continues to the south rim on Eremita Mesa and the trail's western terminus. Eremita Mesa is a remote area of the park and provides no access back to Grand Canyon Village or Hermit's Rest except by unmaintained gravel roads.

See also
 The Grand Canyon
 List of trails in Grand Canyon National Park

References
 Grand Canyon Explorer, Dripping Springs Trail description

External links

 Grand Canyon National Park, Official site

Hiking trails in Grand Canyon National Park
Grand Canyon, South Rim
Grand Canyon, South Rim (west)